Josef Grafl (1872–1915) was an Austrian heavyweight weightlifter who won six world titles in 1908–13.

References

1872 births
1915 deaths
Austrian male weightlifters
World Weightlifting Championships medalists
Sportspeople from Vienna
20th-century Austrian people